Begonia rajah is a species of flowering plant in the family Begoniaceae, native to Terengganu state, Peninsula Malaysia. It typically has striking bronze leaves and contrasting green veins, and is best suited for terrariums.

References

rajah
Endemic flora of Peninsular Malaysia
Plants described in 1911